David Vance may refer to:

 David Vance (soldier) ( – 1813), American soldier in the Revolutionary War
 David Vance (politician) (1836–1912), American shipmaster and politician.
 David R. Vance (born 1940), American Thoroughbred horse racing trainer